General Wallace may refer to:

Christopher Wallace (British Army officer) (1943–2016), British Army lieutenant general
Clarence R. Wallace (1897–1988), U.S. Marine Corps brigadier general
Daniel Wallace (politician) (1801–1859), South Carolina State Militia major general
James Maxwell Wallace (1783–1867), British Army general
John Alexander Wallace (British Army officer) (c. 1775–1857), British Army general
Lew Wallace (1827–1905), Union Army major general 
Peter Margetson Wallace (1780–1864), British Army general
W. H. L. Wallace (1821–1862), Union Army brigadier general
William J. Wallace (USMC) (1895–1977, U.S. Marine Corps lieutenant general
William Henry Wallace (1827–1901), Confederate States Army brigadier general
William Miller Wallace (1844–1924), U.S. Army brigadier general
William S. Wallace (born 1946), U.S. Army four-star general
William Wallace (c. 1270–1305), Scottish general

See also
Lewis Bayly Wallis (1775–1848), British Army general
Attorney General Wallace (disambiguation)